Cattier (or Champagne Cattier) is a family-owned Champagne house located in Chigny-les-Roses, a Premier Cru village of the Montagne de Reims, part of Champagne, France. The Cattier family has owned vineyards since 1625, and has been running the House for over 13 generations.

Family history

In 1916 Jean Cattier had to leave the battlefront because of a severe war injury. He came back to Chigny-les-Roses, where his family had been growing vines since 1625.
The city of Reims, besieged by the German army, crumbled under the shells and 60% of the city was destroyed. Champagne merchants were trying to keep a modest activity in these tough conditions, but they couldn't get grapes in the nearby vineyards. In order not to lose his 1916 paltry harvest, Jean Cattier decided to produce his own champagne. The first bottles were released in 1918 to celebrate the end of WWI.

In 1936 his son Jean Cattier married Nelly. They had 3 children : Jean-Louis, Liliane and Jean-Jacques. They made the activity grow, shared their passion and then passed the company to their children. Jean-Louis took charge of the vineyard in the early 1960s, after having done his military service in Algeria. Liliane took care of the office duties and welcomed customers. Jean-Jacques, as an oenologist, was in charge of the wine-making process, and then dealt with the administrative and trade management.

In 1951 Jean Cattier acquired the Clos du Moulin, one of the rare historical clos in the Champagne region. He restored this 2.2 hectares parcel that was destroyed during the wars. He produced his first wine out of this parcel in 1952, his first bottling in 1953 and his first sale in 1956. It was, at the time, one of the two clos produced and sold in the Champagne region. Jean Cattier was then considered as a precursor for two main reasons : creating a cuvée that was both a clos and a prestigious champagne.

In 2011 Alexandre Cattier took over from his father, Jean-Jacques Cattier. He is also an oenologist and, like his father, is passionate about champagne. Alexandre and his cousins, Agathe and Marie, daughters of respectively Liliane and Jean-Louis, are still running the company today.

Cellars and architecture

The cellars of Champagne Cattier are located in Rilly-la-Montagne, with a storage capacity of 2 million bottles. Historically the depth of Champagne cellars is estimated by the number of steps, since there was no technical mean to measure it.
With their 119 steps (27 meters), the cellars of Champagne Cattier are the deepest ones, just before those of the House  that are composed of 116 steps. Such a depth allows the champagnes to age in perfect conditions: at room temperature, sheltered from any turbulence from the outside.
Champagne Cattier's cellars have the particularity of being dug on 3 levels. Each level is showing characteristics of a specific era : Gothic, Roman and Renaissance. During WWII the cellars were used as shelters from the bombings.

See also
 Maison Cattier Official Site in French and in English
 List of Champagne houses

References

Champagne producers
1918 establishments in France